The Getaway is an action-adventure open world video game developed by Team Soho and published by Sony Computer Entertainment for the PlayStation 2. The Getaway is inspired by British gangster films, most notably Get Carter and Snatch. Initially, the release of the game was to coincide with the launch of the PlayStation 2 in 2000, but was delayed by 27 months due to the difficulty of re-creating large areas of London in high resolution.

The game focuses on two characters each with their own plot settings, Mark Hammond, an ex-bank robber, and Detective Constable Frank Carter, a police officer in service with the Flying Squad, with both plots running parallel and intersecting before concluding in the finale of the game. A sequel, entitled The Getaway: Black Monday, was released in 2004.

Gameplay
The Getaway is designed as a third-person sandbox game in which the player controls the two lead characters as they carry out their missions for game progression. Both of the two characters can perform a series of physical tasks, such as walking, sprinting, rolling, shooting, and taking cover during a gunfight. Once Mark Hammond's missions are completed free-roaming is unlocked for his character, which allows roaming around the City district and Central London without mission objectives or time-limits. Due to similarities to the Grand Theft Auto series, it is often labeled as a Grand Theft Auto clone.

The game features a number of licensed vehicles from real automobile manufacturers that the player can control; unlike those seen in Grand Theft Auto, which are fictional. The majority of the vehicles in the game are made by MG Rover Group, Jensen Motors, Saab, PSA Peugeot Citroën, Fiat, and Lexus, along with a number of others. Firearms and weapons available to the player include the Glock 17 pistol, the AK-47 assault rifle, Remington 870 pump action shotgun, and the Heckler & Koch MP5 submachine gun; other weapons include a cleaver and crowbar, among others.

A major feature in the game was its approach to immersion and being "movie-like", achieved mostly by not including the typical HUD, such as with car chases being done by using the vehicle's indicators to direct the player, rather than a large arrow above the car, or the player characters limping or bleeding profusely to represent low health instead of a health bar/meter.

Plot
The entirety of the game takes place in London, during the span of a single day, and is played through the perspectives of two characters: ex-convict Mark Hammond and Detective Constable Frank Carter of the Flying Squad.

Mark Hammond

Recently released from prison for armed robbery, Mark Hammond witnesses the kidnapping of his son, Alex, and the unintentional murder of his wife, Susie. Mark pursues his son's kidnappers, but is knocked out and brought before Charlie Jolson, the head of the Bethnal Green mob. After Alex's life is threatened, Mark is forced to do several jobs for Charlie, such as ambushing a prison transfer to free Charlie's nephew, "Crazy" Jake Jolson, as well as instigating a gang war between the Yardies and the Triads. Due to Mark's criminal history, any possibility of police assistance to him unlikely, which was exacerbated by Mark unintentionally touching the gun that shot Susie, leading to the police believing he killed her and kidnapped Alex.

Mark is sent on increasingly risky tasks, culminating in the execution of corrupt Detective Chief Inspector Clive McCormack, who arrested Mark five years prior, in a police station. However, Mark spares his other target, Yasmin, in return for information on Alex, as she was present at his kidnapping and Susie's murder. Afterwards, Mark steals £300,000 worth of Yardie drug money, but secretly stashes it with Liam, his close friend, having become wary of Charlie's intentions. Mark's suspicions are later confirmed at the cash drop-off, but before Mark can flee, he is captured. Charlie later reveals to Mark and Yasmin that his ultimate plan is to wipe out his rivals and take over London in their absence, with Mark acting as the scapegoat.

Frank Carter

Detectives Frank Carter and Joe Fielding identify Jake at a safe house, and move in to arrest him; Joe is wounded in the encounter, but Frank successfully arrests Jake. Frank is then sent to respond to the chaos instigated by Mark, but his suspicions are roused when he is placed on a convoy escort duty for Jake, which Mark attacks. McCormack, Frank's boss, suspends Frank on trumped-up charges following the incident. A suspicious Frank follows McCormack to one of Charlie's depots, but before he can clear his name, he witnesses Mark murder McCormack. Recovering in the hospital, Joe points Frank toward another one of Charlie's warehouses, where he finds the captured Mark and Yasmin, and agrees to help them in bringing Charlie down.

Finale

Mark, Yasmin, and Frank converge on the Sol Vita, berthed at St Saviour's Dock, where Charlie has taken Alex and where he intends on destroying his rival gangs with a bomb. Following a shootout, Mark and Yasmin rescue Alex and are able to escape the ship mere moments before the bomb detonates, while Frank fights his way out, leaving Charlie and several gang affiliates to die in the explosion .

Development

The game originally began life on the 32-bit PlayStation, off the back of Porsche Challenge. After having made an acclaimed circuit driving game, Brendan McNamara – like many other developers at the time – felt that a free-roaming vehicle game was an interesting concept worth exploring. The title was prototyped and playable missions were made, but it then evolved into a PlayStation 2 project. However, the original code was kept and there was talk of including it on the finished game, which would ultimately not happen.  Apart from several screenshots printed in the Official U.S. PlayStation Magazine, the original version would never see release.

In moving over to vastly more capable hardware, the scope of the title expanded, as did its ambitions. Bizarre Creations were generating a lot attention due to their successful result in reproducing the streets of central London for their Sega Dreamcast racer Metropolis Street Racer (MSR). As MSR was being hyped and primed for release as one of the Dreamcast's so-called "killer applications", Sony Computer Entertainment Europe felt compelled to attempt to steal Sega's thunder by promising the creation of a PlayStation 2 title which would re-create a massive 113 square kilometers (70 square miles) of London, displaying the ferocity with which Sony Computer Entertainment Europe was willing to attempt to challenge its veteran competitor. The final creation actually only yielded an area of 16 square kilometers (10 square miles).

Re-creating even 16 square kilometers proved a daunting task and a technical nightmare, factors which may have delayed the release of The Getaway by several years. In the case of the latter, the programmers had to perfect an engine that could constantly stream three-dimensional geometry and texture data; of the areas of London the player was currently in close proximity to. At no point was the entire city loaded into memory, as it simply wouldn't fit. Unlike Rockstar's Grand Theft Auto III, it was not an acceptable option for the Team Soho developers to break the city up into separate regions and impose a loading time delay when crossing between areas.

The hype surrounding the project began in earnest just before E3 2000, when a series of screenshots were published online. They revealed an amazing level of detail, clearly showing the very identifiable streets near Team Soho's studio. Though it has been argued that these shots were actually mock-up pre-renders, it is possible they were taken from actual code that received further detailed vehicle and character models, higher resolution textures and also anti-aliased the final output.

Although the prototype game was constantly shown behind closed doors, the public was not privy to its results for at least another year. It was only finally made playable at E3 2002. By then, the project had ballooned, exceeding its development budget many times over. Sony Computer Entertainment Europe had a range of other titles in development; however, the decision was taken by Phil Harrison to can many of them, perhaps to allow yet more funds to be poured into The Getaway.  As a result of this, the axe was to fall on two of its studios, Sony Computer Entertainment Europe Manchester and Sony Computer Entertainment Europe Leeds.

When the game was launched in December 2002 it was a huge seller across Europe, especially in the United Kingdom. Worldwide and particularly in the United States, the game received mixed reviews and sales. The fact that it was released around the same time as the hugely-popular Grand Theft Auto: Vice City (to which the game was often compared) also hurt sales, despite a large marketing campaign in the United States.

Soundtrack
The game's soundtrack is complemented by a title song and cutscene soundtrack, performed by the London Philharmonic Orchestra. The game's soundtrack was chiefly composed by Andrew Hale, while portions of the soundtrack were written by Shawn Lee, who would later compose music for another sandbox-style game, Bully.

Controversy
One alteration that Team Soho had to make was the removal of a vehicle and phone box logos which appeared in the initial release of the game. During one of Hammond's missions, a British Telecommunications (BT) van is used in a mission in which Hammond must kill the driver and take the van to assassinate a corrupt police officer. BT complained that it "did not want [its] name and livery associated with the violent scenes" in the game, and was worried that it "might incite attacks on [its] engineers". Although the initial release of the game was not recalled, subsequent production was amended to remove the offending details.

Ban in Australia
Originally passed with an MA 15+ rating for the uncut version on 22 November 2002, it was resubmitted and banned 5 days later due to a scene of detailed torture. A censored version, omitting this scene, was released on 13 December the same year, with the identical rating.

Reception

The Getaway received "average" reviews according to video game review aggregator Metacritic.

Maxim gave the game a score of eight out of ten and wrote: "If the ensuing police brutality doesn't mold you into the model Wheelman, then having to endure those whiny English cop sirens surely will". FHM also gave it a score of four stars out of five and said: "Not just a little similar to GTA III in look, feel, and gameplay, it's nonetheless worth sleeping in front of the game store for this one". However, The Cincinnati Enquirer gave the game a score of three-and-a-half stars out of five, saying that "the biggest hindrance in The Getaway involves its user interface - or lack thereof - as the development team attempted to make the game look and play out like a movie". Entertainment Weekly was very negative of the game, giving it a D and stating: "The level of detail is extraordinary; even the facial expressions are motion captured. But the slickest graphic presentation can't cover for Getaways flawed script. [...] In a game infused with more humor and less pretentious aspirations, these flaws would be more forgivable".

Sales of The Getaway reached 300,000 copies within two weeks of the game's release. It received a "Double Platinum" sales award from the Entertainment and Leisure Software Publishers Association (ELSPA), indicating sales of at least 600,000 copies in the United Kingdom. By July 2006, The Getaway had sold 1 million copies and earned $36 million in the United States. Next Generation ranked it as the 53rd highest-selling game launched for the PlayStation 2, Xbox, or GameCube between January 2000 and July 2006 in that country. According to Mike Rouse, a former Sony developer who worked on The Getaway, it sold almost 4 million copies in total.

In a retrospective article from 2014, Den of Geek made the game number 23 in their top 50 underappreciated PlayStation 2 games list. In 2020, Push Square included the game and its sequel in a list of games they would like to see released on the PlayStation 4.

Sequels

The Getaway: Black Monday

The Getaway: Black Monday is the second game in the series and was again developed for the PlayStation 2 in 2004. The game's story is based on such films as The Long Good Friday and Lock, Stock and Two Smoking Barrels.

The Getaway 3
The Getaway 3 was to be the third installment of Sony's The Getaway series for the PlayStation 3 console. The title was reported as cancelled on 4 June 2008, along with Eight Days. In October 2009, the games were reported as not being cancelled, but "on hold".

A technical demo featuring Piccadilly Circus was demonstrated in May 2005 at E3, but this was not directly from the game. It was confirmed that the game would again be set in London.

Information regarding The Getaway 3 was released on 7 March 2008 by screenplay writer Katie Ellwood, who affirmed the action title was still in the works. No estimated release date was given, but Ellwood did say that Sony executives were making deals with film companies about the possibility of a future film adaptation of The Getaway 3.

Nicolas Doucet said: "I would not say they have been abandoned, just put to one side. Much work had been done. The studio just wanted to focus on its strengths, EyeToy and SingStar. Given the potential of EyePet, priorities have been changed, but the other projects aren't dead yet. Ultimately, the decision [to put those games to one side] has benefited everyone".

Richard Bunn, a former developer, had noted the game was cancelled shortly after Phil Harrison was replaced by Shuhei Yoshida as president of SCE Worldwide Studios.

References

External links
Official website

2002 video games
Action-adventure games
Censored video games
Child abduction in fiction
Obscenity controversies in video games
Open-world video games
Organized crime video games
PlayStation 2 games
PlayStation 2-only games
Single-player video games
Sony Interactive Entertainment franchises
Sony Interactive Entertainment games
Video games adapted into television shows
Video games about police officers
Video games developed in the United Kingdom
Video games set in 2002
Video games set in London
Video games set in the 2000s
Team Soho games